Mihkel Haus (1880–?) was an Estonian politician. He was a member of I Riigikogu. He was a member of the assembly since 10 May 1921. He replaced Jaan Kurgemaa. On 16 July 1921, he resigned his position and he was replaced by Jüri Reinthal.

References

1880 births
Year of death missing
Central Committee of Tallinn Trade Unions politicians
Members of the Riigikogu, 1920–1923